Alfred Bertran Engelsen (16 January 1893 – 13 September 1966) was a Norwegian gymnast and diver who competed in the 1912 Summer Olympics. He was born in Bergen and died in Tvedestrand.

Engelsen was part of the Norwegian team, which won the gold medal in the gymnastics men's team, free system event. He also competed in the plain high diving event but was eliminated in the first round.

References

1893 births
1966 deaths
Norwegian male artistic gymnasts
Norwegian male divers
Olympic gymnasts of Norway
Olympic divers of Norway
Gymnasts at the 1912 Summer Olympics
Divers at the 1912 Summer Olympics
Olympic gold medalists for Norway
Olympic medalists in gymnastics
Sportspeople from Bergen
People from Tvedestrand
Medalists at the 1912 Summer Olympics
20th-century Norwegian people